GFW or GfW may refer to:

Entertainment 
 Games for Windows, a defunct brand owned by Microsoft
 Games for Windows: The Official Magazine
 Global Force Wrestling, an American professional wrestling promotion
 Impact Wrestling, an American professional wrestling promotion, previously known as Global Force Wrestling

Science and technology 
 Global Forest Watch
 Great Firewall of China
 Society for Space Research, now part of the German Aerospace Center

Other uses
 GFW Schools, a school district in Minnesota, United States
 Ghana Federation of Women, a women's organization in Ghana
 Grand Falls-Windsor, in Newfoundland and Labrador, Canada
 Global Fund for Women, a women's rights organization
 Great Fairy Wars
 Global Fishing Watch